The 1993 Triple J Hottest 100, counted down in January 1994, was the inaugural countdown of the most popular songs of the year, according to listeners of the Australian radio station Triple J (as opposed to previous incarnations of the poll, where listeners could vote on any recorded song from any time in history); the change to make the countdown an annual poll was made after organisers realised that the poll's results were unlikely to significantly change from year to year. About 50,000 votes were counted for this countdown. 

A double CD featuring 32 of the songs was released. This compilation was, and many of the ones to follow in future years were, some of the highest-selling CDs in Australia.

Full list

24 of the 100 tracks are by Australian artists (marked with a green background).

Artists with multiple entries

Countries represented

CD release

Disc one

Disc two

Replacements
In 2004, the album was reissued by Universal Music Australia. The reissue removed "Asshole" and replaced 5 of the songs from the original release with different songs. They are:
 "Linger" is replaced with "Trout" by Neneh Cherry and Michael Stipe
 "Sober" is replaced with "Friday I'm in Love" by The Cure
 "All That She Wants" is replaced with "Animal Nitrate" by Suede
 "My Sister" is replaced with "I Feel You" by Depeche Mode
 "Push th' Little Daisies" is replaced with "World (The Price of Love)" by New Order

Notes

References

External links
Triple J Hottest 100 of 1993

See also
1993 in music

1993
1993 in Australian music
1993 record charts